Barrick Nealy (born August 7, 1983) is a former American and Canadian football quarterback who played for the Calgary Stampeders. Nealy is currently the Wide Receiver Coach for the San Marcos Baptist Academy in San Marcos, TX.

College career
A quarterback at Texas State University, Nealy was honored as the 2005 Southland Conference Player of the Year after leading Texas State to its first-ever regular season conference championship.  He held Texas State's career records for passing yards and total yards, and finished fifth in the voting for the 2005 Walter Payton Award.

For the twenty previous years, prior to Nealy coming to the institution from the University of Houston, the Bobcats had never made the I-AA playoffs. During his senior season, Nealy led his team to playoff victories over Georgia Southern and Cal Poly before falling in the I-AA semifinals to eventual I-AA runner-up the University of Northern Iowa. All three games were nationally televised by ESPN2 from Bobcat Stadium in San Marcos, Texas.

The playoff dream may have not been realized had the Bobcats fallen in their season finale to rival Sam Houston State. Despite several Nealy turnovers, the Bobcats prevailed in overtime over the Bearkats in San Marcos. The Bobcats entered the playoffs as a fourth seed.

Nealy had a standout performance against Texas A&M in a game that took place in College Station, Texas. In this game Nealy went 26 for 34, completing 76.5% of his passes for 378 yards and 3 touchdowns.  He also rushed for 36 yards and another score. This game made many around the nation and in the state of Texas take notice of the Bobcats and more importantly, Nealy. Perhaps Nealy's most dominant game came in the NCAA playoffs against powerhouse Georgia Southern. In that game the Bobcats were trailing late in the fourth quarter and fought back to pull off a huge 50–35 victory.  Nealy went 23 for 32 (71.9%) for 400 yards and 4 touchdowns.  He rushed the ball for 126 yards and one more score.

Professional career
Nealy declared himself eligible for the 2006 NFL Draft, but was not selected. He signed on as a free agent Wide Receiver with the Minnesota Vikings in May 2006. He was released by the Vikings in July 2006 and signed a contract with the Calgary Stampeders of the Canadian Football League instead. Assigned to the practice roster, Nealy later asked to be released from his contract to attend personal business. In 2007, he returned to the Stampeders as the third quarterback on the roster.

Nealy retired from the Stampeders after two meetings with head coach Hufnagel on Friday, June 11, 2010, saying that football was no longer fun for him.  He was retained on the retired list rather than simply being released, which entitles the Stampeders to compensation in the event that he signs with another team.

Notes

1983 births
Living people
American football quarterbacks
American players of Canadian football
Calgary Stampeders players
Houston Cougars football players
Texas State Bobcats football players
Canadian football quarterbacks
Players of American football from Dallas
Players of Canadian football from Dallas